"Search and Destroy" is the 19th episode of the fourth season of the American television drama series Person of Interest. It is the 87th overall episode of the series and is written by producer Zak Schwartz and directed by Stephen Surjik. It aired on CBS in the United States and on CTV in Canada on April 7, 2015.

The series revolves around a computer program for the federal government known as "The Machine" that is capable of collating all sources of information to predict terrorist acts and to identify people planning them. A team follows "irrelevant" crimes: lesser level of priority for the government. However, their security and safety is put in danger following the activation of a new program named Samaritan. In the episode, Reese and Finch must protect the CEO of a company following a leak that may lead to his downfall and possible death. The title refers to "Search and destroy", a military strategy where the idea was to insert ground forces into hostile territory, search out the enemy, destroy them, and withdraw immediately afterward.

According to Nielsen Media Research, the episode was seen by an estimated 8.67 million household viewers and gained a 1.3/4 ratings share among adults aged 18–49. The episode received highly positive reviews, with critics praising the writing, performances and action scenes.

Plot
Reese (Jim Caviezel) and Finch (Michael Emerson) investigate their new number: Sulaiman Khan (Aasif Mandvi), CEO of Castellum, a company known for having the most powerful antivirus software. Khan's company has been hacked and documents show that he might be committing embezzlement.

Khan's company starts debating whether they should suspend Khan over the recent leaks. Due to Finch not wanting to work with Root (Amy Acker), Reese has Zoe Morgan (Paige Turco) infiltrate the company. The board of directors unanimously decide to remove Khan from his position and he storms out. The team realizes that Samaritan is behind everything and despite Finch's insistence in not intervening, Reese decides to continue with the mission. Khan tries to get in the company's server room but the police arrives. Khan is arrested and sent to Rikers Island after just 20 minutes of custody. The team realizes Samaritan plans to kill Khan.

Meanwhile, Root uses another alias to go to a restaurant and uses a toxin to sedate everyone and leave with a briefcase. She is pursued by Decima agents but she subdues them. Her actions attract interest from Greer (John Nolan), who sends Rousseau (Cara Buono) to kill her.

Unable to release Khan, Reese is forced to help Khan escape from prison. During their car escape, Samaritan activates a roadblock which causes the car to crash. Root arrives to save them and take them to a safe house. Khan reveals that the power of the company must be connected to artificial intelligence and that there might be an underground lair on a forest with more information. They find the lair in the forest and discover that Samaritan hacked all the servers of the company and is using (as well as modifying) Khan's antivirus software. They are ambushed by Decima agents and upon realizing the true nature of Samaritan, Khan escapes. Root fights Rousseau and nearly kills until they are forced to flee when more agents arrive.

At the station, Root receives a code from the Machine to open the briefcase, revealing a Fabergé egg inside. She then smashes it when the Machine orders her to do it. Reese and Finch deduce that Samaritan is using Khan's software to find the Machine's location. Khan is revealed to be captured and brought to Greer. He asks to "look Samaritan in its eyes", to which Greer responds by shooting him dead.

Reception

Viewers
In its original American broadcast, "Search and Destroy" was seen by an estimated 8.67 million household viewers and gained a 1.3/4 ratings share among adults aged 18–49, according to Nielsen Media Research. This means that 1.3 percent of all households with televisions watched the episode, while 4 percent of all households watching television at that time watched it. This was a 6% decrease in viewership from the previous episode, which was watched by 9.15 million viewers with a 1.5/5 in the 18-49 demographics. With these ratings, Person of Interest was the third most watched show on CBS for the night, behind NCIS: New Orleans and NCIS, second on its timeslot and sixth for the night in the 18-49 demographics, behind Fresh Off the Boat, Agents of S.H.I.E.L.D., NCIS: New Orleans, NCIS, and The Voice.

With Live +7 DVR factored in, the episode was watched by 11.99 million viewers with a 2.1 in the 18-49 demographics.

Critical reviews
"Search and Destroy" received highly positive reviews from critics. Matt Fowler of IGN gave the episode a "great" 8.8 out of 10 rating and wrote in his verdict, "In 'Search and Destroy,' Samaritan wasn't out to recruit, it was out to obliterate. Much like the 'terrorists' it helped destroy back in 'Control-Alt-Delete,' Khan found himself ruined and killed as part of Samaritan's plan to defeat its rivals and dominate humanity. The way it railroaded Khan into prison in order to kill him off was sort of terrifying, and the way it popped up those bollards to stop Reese on the road proved that it could be physically dangerous without human help. Also, Root and Martine's rivalry makes for fun TV. Their first gun fight was better, but this time Root got to throw out a cool 'places to go, people to kill' line."

Alexa Planje of The A.V. Club gave the episode an "A" grade and wrote, "'Search and Destroy' is not the most cerebral episode of Person of Interest, but that hardly matters when everything from the writing, to the performances, to the technical components are executed at such a high level. This episode is heavy on the action and thrills, not to mention the spare but effective comedy."

References

External links 
 

Person of Interest (TV series) episodes
2015 American television episodes